"Rise & Fall" is a song recorded by Australian dance-pop group Justice Crew. It was released digitally and physically on 24 October 2014, as the fifth single from their debut studio album Live by the Words. It was written and produced by Robopop with Emily Laura Katter, Sam Nicolosi and DNA Songs and is a mid-tempo pop track. It debuted at number 11 in Australia.

Background and release
Following the success of "Que Sera", Justice Crew featured on Beau Ryan's single "Where You From?" and announced their new single would be titled "Rise & Fall" on 26 September.

On Rise & Fall, Justice Crew turn away from the house music sound by experimenting with soft-rock. Justice Crew member John Pearce explains, "We have had our pop music and our club bangers, but we edged off to the side with 'Que Sera' and now with 'Rise & Fall' we are exploring a whole new side to Justice Crew. It's got a sort of 'love' meaning behind it... it is a romantic song, but the lyrics are really metaphorical." "'Rise & Fall' is definitely a new sound for us, but I think it's a really good direction that we're heading in. We're really excited to see what people think."

Music videos
The music video was filmed on Daydream Island and features the boys walking along the beach, swimming, cuddling with women by the campfire and walking hand in hand into the sunset. The video was released via Justice Crew's Vevo account on 30 October.

Track listing
Digital download
"Rise & Fall" – 3:44

CD single
"Rise & Fall" – 3:44
"Rise & Fall" – 3:44 (karaoke version)

Charts and certifications

Weekly charts

Year-end charts

Certifications

Release history

References

2014 songs
2014 singles
Justice Crew songs
Sony Music Australia singles
Songs written by Robopop